Head First is the fifth concert tour from British band Goldfrapp in support of their fifth studio album, Head First, released in March 2010.

Development
The tour was announced in early February 2010, with the release of their new album by their record company Mute. The band announced dates in Europe, Australia and North America, where they played the famous Hollywood Bowl. It was announced by Mute that the band would play festivals throughout summer 2010, then embark on their tour. Before the festivals, however, they were due to play their American dates as stated here officially: "Goldfrapp will take Head First to select US cities this summer - following the massive acclaim for both the Supernature and Seventh Tree tours and festival appearances around the world, Goldfrapp have underlined their reputation as one of the most transcendent and inventive live bands around."

Dates for the United Kingdom were announced on the band's website on 12 July 2010.

Show
Goldfrapp open with "Voicething" as the band come on stage, with smoke billowing out of the stage. Alison then appears and launches into "Crystalline Green", with a green light show playing around her. Each song from this point uses the lights, with different colours. The background of the stage is a massive Space Doughnut.

Band
The band consists of 5 members (including Alison Goldfrapp). These are:

 Charlie Jones - bass guitar
 Daisy Palmer - drums, backing vocals
 Angie Pollock - keyboards, backing vocals
 Davide Rossi - keyboards, guitar, violin, backing vocals

Set list

 Voicething (Intro) 
 Crystalline Green 
 Train
 I Wanna Life 
 A&E 
 You Never Know 
 Head First 
 Number 1
 Believer
 Shiny & Warm 
 Alive
 Ride a White Horse (extended) 
 Ooh La La
 Utopia
 Rocket 
 Strict Machine (We are glitter)

Main order of songs - Order has changed in some cases.

 Voicething (intro) 
 Crystalline Green 
 I Wanna Life 
 A&E 
 You Never Know 
 Head First 
 Number 1 
 Dreaming 
 Believer 
 Alive 
 Shiny & Warm 
 Train 
 Ride A White Horse (extended) 
 Ooh La La 
 Utopia 
 Black Cherry
 Rocket 
 Strict Machine (We are glitter)

Additional notes:
"Dreaming" was added and "You Never Know" was removed from the set list in Washington.
"You Never Know" was re-added in New York.
"Utopia" was removed from the set list in Mexico.
"Hunt" was added for the Norwich concert.

Main order of songs - order has changed in some cases.

 Voicething (intro) 
 Crystalline Green
 You Never Know
 Dreaming
 I Wanna Life 
 Head First 
 Number 1
 Alive 
 Believer 
 Shiny & Warm 
 Train 
 Ride a White Horse (extended) 
 Ooh La La 
 Black Cherry
 Little Bird
 Lovely Head
 Rocket 
 Strict Machine (We are glitter)

Additional notes:

"Hunt" was added for the Norwich concert.
"Rocket" was removed in Bristol.

 Voicething
 Utopia 
 You Never Know 
 Head First 
 Dreaming 
 Number 1 
 Believer 
 Alive 
 Shiny and Warm 
 Train 
 Ride a White Horse (extended) 
 Ooh La La 
 Rocket 
 Strict Machine (We are glitter)

Critical reception

Concerts
Reviews for the tour have all been positive. Spinner, talking of the Hollywood Bowl appearance, said, "Golfrapp made her way through 12 songs backed by a tight four-piece band. If the band was daunted at all by the huge stage of the Bowl, they never showed it, opening with a version of 'Crystalline Green' that won the crowd over from the outset. The group really hit its stride halfway through the set, as two songs from the new 'Head First' album -- the pop-laden 'Believer' and 'Alive' -- had fans dancing in the Bowl aisles.".

The Washington Post review was also very positive, stating, "Goldfrapp has built up quite a cult. The performance was sold out and a few devout fans even showed up wearing blonde wigs. Over an hour and a half set Goldfrapp changed costumes--musical and otherwise--a few times, putting a digital spin on pretty much every genre that has ever aspired to fabulousness--including glam-rock, disco, and a few Bond-theme-worthy ballads. It was a familiar sound with a futuristic finish."

The Entertainment Weekly review of the New York gig's headline was "Goldfrapp at NYC's Hammerstein Ballroom....It's Finally Lovely 2 C U" also stated, "'Voicething' was a brilliant opener, launching right into the thumping 'Crystalline Green' from 2003′s Black Cherry. Alison, in full sparkle mode, started stomping around right away and quickly lost herself in a dizzying feast of outstretched arms and those ethereal wails we know and love."

Australian magazine TheVine's review was positive, with the reviewer stating "she has an amazing range that puts her in the same league as Kate Bush." They also stated, "Goldfrapp will take you on a journey through the darkened slums, the seedy clubs, the flamboyant nightspots and the palatial high rises."

On the start of their UK tour, reviews have been positive. ThisisBristol proclaimed, "In a pop world almost devoid of eccentricity and risk-taking, thank God for Alison Goldfrapp." Giving them 7/10, they also stated "Much copied, never bettered, Goldfrapp's disco weirdness is still a treat."

Festival reviews
The Big Issue gave a positive review: "Alison Goldfrapp has to win some kind of prize for most stylish lady of the weekend. TBI feels rude for being so covered in mud in her presence, as she sways in a sparkly black poncho (billowed by a strategically placed fan...). The incredibly visual set is punctuated by hit after hit ('Number One', 'White Horse', 'Train'), all led by Goldfrapp's sensual, ethereal vocals and underwritten by undulating synths and retro basslines. "Scotland, you’re gorgeous", she says. No, Alison. You are."

The Scotsman commented, "Goldfrapp brought their usual artfully choreographed flamboyance and glamour to another full-on irresistible performance."

Tour dates

 A free show as part of the Heineken Green Spheres, a free music series in Ireland

Sold-out shows
The show on 26 November in Dublin sold out, and due to high demand a second date was immediately announced.

References

Goldfrapp
2010 concert tours